Lasko – Die Faust Gottes (English: God's Fist) is a German action television series, an RTL co-production with ORF. First aired on 18 June 2009, it is set in a monastery and involves martial arts. The main character is a monk named Lasko, who uses martial arts to defend the downtrodden. Fifteen 45 minute episodes have been produced, in two series. The series was shot in the Naumburg area, Pforta, Neuenburg Castle and Königstein Fortress.

It is a sequel to the 2006 film .

See also
List of German television series

External links
 

German action television series
German crime television series
2009 German television series debuts
2010 German television series endings
RTL (German TV channel) original programming
German-language television shows
Martial arts television series